Jan Sivertsen (born 24 October 1951 in Frederiksberg, Denmark) is a Danish painter.

He was trained at the Royal Danish Academy of Fine Arts in Copenhagen 1977-1982. Since 1982 he lives and works in Paris, France.

References

20th-century Danish painters
21st-century Danish painters
1951 births
Living people